Allocasuarina brachystachya is a shrub native to northern New South Wales.

References

brachystachya
Flora of New South Wales
Fagales of Australia
Taxa named by Lawrence Alexander Sidney Johnson
Plants described in 1989